Elections to Hinckley and Bosworth Council were held on 4 May 1995.  The whole council was up for election.  The Conservative Party lost overall control of the council. The overall turnout was 43.6%.

Election Result

Ward results

References

1995
1995 English local elections
1990s in Leicestershire